Pingtan is a town in Huiyang District, Huizhou, Guangdong province, China. , it has two residential neighborhoods and 17 villages under its administration: 

Neighborhoods
Pingtan Community
Pingtan Model Living Quarter

Villages
Pingtan Village
Hongguang Village
Yangguang Village
Fangkeng Village
Jinxing Village
Xingang Village
Zhangxin Village
Xintianpu Village
Dushi Village
Guanghui Village
Chuanlong Village
Xinxu Village
Quedi Village
Hehu Village
Jiangnan Village
Guangming Village
Lingwupai Village

See also 
 List of township-level divisions of Guangdong

References 

Towns in Guangdong
Huizhou